Tor Marius Gromstad (8 July 1989 – 12 May 2012) was a Norwegian footballer who played as a defender for Stabæk and FK Arendal.

Career
Gromstad transferred from Arendal to Stabæk in 2007, and he attended the secondary school Norges Toppidrettsgymnas while playing for Stabæk. In total he played 43 matches for the club, and Gromstad started six of the eight first matches in the 2012-season in addition to playing both Stabæk's cup matches.

Disappearance and death 
Gromstad was last seen after leaving his brother's apartment at 07:26 AM (UTC+2) on Saturday 12 May 2012, and was reported missing later the same night. He was not carrying his wallet or cellphone at the time of the disappearance. He was discovered dead on the morning of 14 May 2012, after being missing for 36 hours. According to a press release made by his club, Gromstad died from an accidental fall at a nearby construction site.

Career statistics

References

1989 births
2012 deaths
People from Arendal
Association football midfielders
Norwegian footballers
FK Arendal players
Stabæk Fotball players
Eliteserien players
Accidental deaths in Norway
Accidental deaths from falls
Sportspeople from Agder